Arquatopotamon jizushanense is a freshwater crab species found in Yunnan, China, and the only species of the genus Arquatopotamon. Its carapace is normally darkish brown and the walking legs and chelipeds more reddish brown.

Range and habitat
Arquatopotamon jizushanense was described 2017 by Chu, Zhou & Sun and is only known from the type locality, few small hill streams in Jizushan Town, Binchuan County, Dali City, at an altitude of 1778 meters above sea level.

References 

Potamoidea
Monotypic crustacean genera